Mahakavi Kumaran Asan (Malayalam: എൻ. കുമാരൻ ആശാൻ) (12 April 1873 – 16 January 1924) was a poet of Malayalam literature, Indian social reformer and a philosopher. He is known to have initiated a revolution in Malayalam poetry during the first quarter of the 20th century, transforming it from the metaphysical to the lyrical and his poetry is characterised by its moral and spiritual content, poetic concentration and dramatic contextualisation. He is one of the triumvirate poets of Kerala and a disciple of Sree Narayana Guru. He was awarded the prefix "Mahakavi" in 1922 by the Madras university which means "great poet".

Biography 

Asan was born on April 12, 1873 in a merchant family belonging to the Ezhava community in Kayikkara village, Chirayinkeezhu taluk, Anchuthengu Grama Panchaayath in Travancore to Narayanan Perungudi, a polyglot well versed in Malayalam and Tamil languages, and Kochupennu as the second of their nine children. His early schooling was at a local school by a teacher by name, Udayankuzhi Kochuraman Vaidyar, who taught him elementary Sanskrit after which he continued his studies at the government school in Kayikkara until he was thirteen. Subsequently, he joined the school as a teacher in 1889 but had to quit as he was not old enough to hold a government job. It was during this time, he studied the verses and plays of Sanskrit literature. Later, he started working as an accountant at a local wholesale grocer in 1890, the same year he met Shree Narayana Guru and became the spiritual leader's disciple.

Narayana Guru's influence led Asan to spiritual pursuits and he spent some time at a local temple, in prayers and teaching Sanskrit. Soon, he joined Guru at his Aruvippuram hermitage where he was known as Chinnaswami ("young ascetic"). In 1895, he moved to Bangalore and studied for law, staying with Padmanabhan Palpu. He stayed there only until 1898 as Palpu went to England and a plague epidemic spread over Bangalore and Asan spent the next few months in Madras before proceeding to Calcutta to continue his Sanskrit studies. At Calcutta, he studied at Tarka sastra at the Central Hindu College, studying English simultaneously and also got involved with the Indian Renaissance, but his stay was again cut short due to plague epidemic. He returned to Aruvippuram in 1900.

Asan was also involved with the activities of the Sree Narayana Dharma Paripalana Yogam (SNDP) and became its secretary in 1904. The same year, he founded Vivekodayam, a literary journal in Malayalam, and assumed its editorship. Under his leadership, the magazine became a monthly from a bi-monthly. In 1913, he was elected to the Sree Moolam Popular Assembly (Sri Moolam Praja Sabha), the first popularly elected legislature in the history of India. He relinquished the position at SNDP in 1919 and a year later, took over the editorship of Pratibha, another literary magazine  In 1921, he started a clay tile factory, Union Tile Works, in Aluva but when it was found that the factory was polluting the nearby palace pond, he shifted the project to a site near Aluva river and handed over the land to SNDP for building an Advaitashramam. Later, he moved to Thonnakkal, a village in the periphery of Thiruvananthapuram, where he settled with his wife. In 1923, he contested in assembly election from Quilon constituency but lost to Sankara Menon.

Asan married Bhanumathiamma, the daughter of Thachakudy Kumaran Writer who was a cousin of Padmanabhan Palpu in 1917.

Death
On January 16, 1924, he died by drowning, when Redeemer, the boat he was traveling capsized in River Pallana. His body was recovered after two days and the place where his mortal remains were cremated is known as Kumarakodi.

Legacy 

Kumaran Asan was one of the triumvirate poets of modern Malayalam, along with Vallathol Narayana Menon and Ulloor S. Parameswara Iyer. Some of the earlier works of the poet were Subramanya Sathakam and Sankara Sathakam, which were devotional in content but his later poems were marked by social commentary. He published Veena Poovu (the fallen flower) in December 1907 in Mithavadi of Moorkoth Kumaran which went on to become a literary classic in Malayalam; its centenary was celebrated in 2017 when a book, Veenapoovinu 100 was published which carried an introduction by M. M. Basheer and an English translation of the poem by K. Jayakumar. Prarodanam, an elegy,  mourning the death of his contemporary, friend and grammarian, A. R. Raja Raja Varma, Khanda Kavyas (poems) such as Nalini, Leela, Karuna, Chandaalabhikshuki, Chinthaavishtayaaya Seetha, and Duravastha are some of his other major works. Besides, he wrote two epics, Buddha Charitha in 5 volumes and Balaramayanam, a three-volume work.

Honours 
In 1958, when Joseph Mundassery was the Minister of Education, the Government of Kerala acquired Asan's house in Thonnakkal and established the Kumaran Asan National Institute of Culture (Kanic), as a memorial for the poet, the first instance in Kerala history when the government took over a poet's property to convert it into a memorial. It houses an archives, a museum and a publications division. Asan Memorial Association, a Chennai-based organization, has built a memorial at Kayikkara, the birthplace of the poet. They have also instituted an annual award, Asan Smaraka Kavitha Puraskaram, for recognising excellence in Malayalam poetry. The award carries a cash prize of 30,000 and Sugathakumari, O. N. V. Kurup, K. Ayyappa Panicker and K. Satchidanandan are some of the recipients of the award. Asan Memorial Senior Secondary School is a CBSE affiliated higher secondary school run by Asan Memorial Association. The India Post issued a commemorative postage stamp depicting Asan's portrait in 1973, in connection with his birth centenary.

Works

Major works

Other works 

Kumaran Asan also wrote many other poems. Some of these poems are listed in the book Asante Padyakrthikal under the name "Mattu Krthikal" (Other Works):

Sadaachaarasathakam
Sariyaaya Parishkaranam
Bhaashaaposhinisabhayodu
Saamaanyadharmangal
Subrahmanyapanchakam
Mrthyanjayam
Pravaasakaalaththu Naattile Ormakal
This is another collection of poems that come from various letters Kumaran Asan wrote over the course of several years. None of the poems were longer than thirty-two lines.
Koottu Kavitha

The other poems are lesser known. Only a few of them have names:

Kavikalkkupadesam
Mangalam
Oru Kathth
This is another one of Asan's letter-poems.
Randu Aasamsaapadyangal

poems or stories which are written by kritikal 
1. Leela 
2. veenpuv 
3. nlene
4. kruna
4. parodnam

Prose

Translations

Works on Asan

See also

Asan Smaraka Kavitha Puraskaram
Thunchath Ezhuthachan Malayalam University
Vallathol Narayana Menon
Ulloor S. Parameswara Iyer
Pandalam Kerala Varma

Notes

References

External links

 
 
 
 

1873 births
1924 deaths
Indian male poets
Malayalam-language writers
Malayalam poets
Poets from Kerala
Activists from Kerala
Indian Sanskrit scholars
Writers from Thiruvananthapuram
The Sanskrit College and University alumni
University of Calcutta alumni
Deaths by drowning in India
Deaths due to shipwreck
Indian social reformers
20th-century Indian poets
19th-century Indian poets
19th-century Indian male writers
Scholars from Thiruvananthapuram
20th-century Indian male writers
Poets in British India